This is a list of players who played at least one game for the Toronto Toros of the World Hockey Association from 1973–74 to 1975–76.



A
Mike Amodeo,
Steve Atkinson,

B
Gilles Bilodeau,
Les Binkley,
Frank Blum,
Carl Brewer,

C
Wayne Carleton,
Paul Crowley,
Steve Cuddie,
Rick Cunningham,

D
Bob D'Alvise,
Wayne Dillon,
Jim Dorey,
Rich Dupras,

F
Richard Farda,
Tony Featherstone,
Peter Folco,
Rick Foley,

G
John Garrett,
Brian Gibbons,
Gerard Gibbons,
Jack Gibson,
Gilles Gratton,

H
Paul Heaver,
Paul Henderson,
Pat Hickey,
Bill Holden,

J
Jeff Jacques,

K
Steve King,
Gavin Kirk,
George Kuzmicz,

L
Bob Leduc,

M
Frank Mahovlich,
Peter Marrin,
Tom Martin,
Larry Mavety,

N
Mark Napier,
Vaclav Nedomansky,
Greg Neeld,
Lou Nistico,

O
Billy Orr,

P
Jean-Luc Phaneuf,

R
Jerry Rollins,

S
Brit Selby,
Rick Sentes,
Jim Shaw,
Tom Simpson,
Dave Syvret,

T
Dave Tataryn,
Gord Titcomb,
Guy Trottier,
Jim Turkiewicz,

V
John Van Horlick,
Mario Viens,

W
Steve Warr,
Wayne Wood,

Z
Jerry Zrymiak,

References
Toronto Toros all-time player roster at hockeydb.com

Toronto Toros